The 1936 college football season was the first in which the Associated Press writers' poll selected a national champion. The first AP poll, taken of 35 writers, was released on October 20, 1936. Each writer listed his choice for the top ten teams, and points were tallied based on 10 for first place, 9 for second, etc., and the AP then ranked the twenty teams with the highest number of points.   In the first poll, Minnesota received 32 first place votes, and 3 votes for an additional 25 points, for a total of 345 altogether. Of the seven contemporary math system selectors, two chose Pittsburgh as the top team.

The 1936 season also saw the addition of another major New Year's Day bowl game, as Dallas hosted the first Cotton Bowl Classic.

Conference and program changes

Conference changes
One conference began play in 1936:
Alamo Conference – conference active through the 1940 season
One conference played its final season in 1936:
Chesapeake Conference – conference active since the 1933 season

Membership changes

September
September 19  TCU opened with a 6–0 win at Howard Payne College at Brownwood, Texas.

September 26 In Seattle, Minnesota opened its season with a 14–7 win over Washington.

Defending champ (under the Dickinson ratings) SMU had a tough time in beating North Texas, 6–0, and Rose Bowl winner Stanford lost its opener to visiting Santa Clara 13–0. Sugar Bowl winner TCU lost at Texas Tech 7–0. LSU beat visiting Rice 20–7.
Alabama beat Samford 34–0 and Pittsburgh beat Ohio Wesleyan 53–0.

October
October 3 Santa Clara beat Loyola Marymount 13–6.
LSU and Texas played to a 6–6 tie. Alabama defeated Clemson 32–0.
Northwestern opened with an 18–7 win over Iowa.
Pittsburgh beat West Virginia 34–0.

October 10
Minnesota beat visiting Nebraska 7–0.
Pittsburgh won at Ohio State 6–0.
Washington won at UCLA 14–0.
Santa Clara beat San Francisco 15–7.
Alabama beat Mississippi State 7–0.
Northwestern beat North Dakota State 40–7.

October 17
Minnesota defeated Michigan 26–0. Santa Clara won at San Jose State 20–0.
In Birmingham, Alabama and Tennessee played to a 0–0 tie. Northwestern edged Ohio State 14–13. In a meeting between Pittsburgh's two unbeaten (3–0–0) and untied schools, Pittsburgh was beaten by Duquesne, 7–0. Washington beat Oregon State 19–7.

The first AP Poll was released on October 20, with Minnesota being the majority favorite, with 32 of 35 first place votes, and 345 out of 350 points.  The Gophers were followed by No. 2 Duke, No. 3 Army, No. 4 Northwestern, and No. 5 Purdue.  USC, ranked No. 6, received one first place vote.

October 24
No. 1 Minnesota hosted No. 5 Purdue in a meeting of unbeaten (3–0–0) schools.  Minnesota proved the AP voters right by winning 33–0.  No. 2 Duke (5–0–0) lost to (1–2–1) Tennessee, 15–13.  No. 3 Army beat Springfield College 33–0.  No. 4 Northwestern won at Illinois 13–2.  No. 8 Washington beat California 13–0.  No. 9 Pittsburgh beat visiting, and previously unbeaten, No. 7 Notre Dame 26–0.  No. 16 Fordham edged visiting No. 12 St. Mary's 7–6.  The next top five was No. 1 Minnesota, No. 2 Pitt, No. 3 Northwestern, No. 4 Washington, and No. 5 Fordham.

October 31  In a Friday night game, No. 1 Minnesota and No. 3 Northwestern, both unbeaten (4–0–0), met in a Big Ten conference game at Evanston.  The Gophers had not lost a game in more than three years, and the game was scoreless after three quarters, until Northwestern's line "ripped a gaping hole in the Gophers' forward wall" and Steve Toth drove across the goal line.  With five minutes left, Minnesota's Rudy Gmitro was in the clear for a touchdown before being brought down by Fred Vanzon, and Northwestern held on for the 6–0 win.

At the Polo Grounds in New York, No. 2 Pittsburgh and No. 5 Fordham played to a 0–0 tie.  In Portland, No. 4 Washington beat Oregon 7–0, but dropped to 6th.  No. 10 Marquette beat visiting No. 20 St. Mary's 20–6 and rose to 4th place.  The next top five was No. 1 Northwestern, No. 2 Minnesota, No. 3 Fordham, No. 4 Marquette, and No. 5 Pitt.

November
November 7
No. 1 Northwestern beat Wisconsin 26–18.
No. 2 Minnesota beat Iowa 52–0.
No. 3 Fordham defeated visiting Purdue 15–0.
No. 4 Marquette narrowly won in Omaha against Creighton, 7–6.
No. 5 Pittsburgh beat Penn State 34–7. No. 14 Alabama and No. 10 Tulane, both 5–0–1, met at Tuscaloosa.  Alabama's 34–7 win was followed by its rise to 4th place in the poll, with Marquette dropping to 8th.

November 14
No. 1 Northwestern won 9–0 at Michigan to clinch the Big Ten title, while No. 2 Minnesota beat Texas 47–19.  No. 3 Fordham was idle.
No. 4 Alabama beat Georgia Tech in Atlanta, 20–16.
No. 5 Pittsburgh won at No. 6 Nebraska 19–6.
In Birmingham, No. 7 LSU beat Auburn 19–6 to extend its record to 7–0–1 and move to 5th place in the poll, with Alabama falling to 8th.

November 21 No. 1 Northwestern lost at No. 11 Notre Dame, 26–6, while No. 2 Minnesota won at Wisconsin 24–0 in their season finale.
No. 3 Fordham and visiting Georgia played to a 7–7 tie.
No. 4 Pittsburgh was idle.
No. 5 LSU beat Lafayette College of Louisiana 93–0.
No. 9 Santa Clara won in San Francisco at St. Mary's, 19–0.  In the poll that followed, Northwestern—which had been one game away from a perfect season—fell to seventh place and Minnesota regained the top spot, ahead of LSU, Alabama, Pitt, and Santa Clara.

On November 26, Thanksgiving Day, No. 3 Alabama beat Vanderbilt 14–6 in Birmingham.
No. 4 Pittsburgh beat its other crosstown rival, Carnegie Tech, 31–14.
No. 6 Washington beat No. 20 Washington State 40–0.
At Yankee Stadium Fordham, which had fallen to 8th, (5–0–2) lost to NYU, 7–6.

November 28
No. 2 LSU clinched the SEC title with a 33–0 win over No. 19 Tulane.
No. 5 Santa Clara lost to No. 18 TCU, 9–0. The final AP Poll ranked Minnesota, LSU, Pitt, Alabama, and Washington as the top five.

Conference standings

Major conference standings

Independents

Minor conferences

Minor conference standings

Rankings

Bowl games

"There is no longer any blot left on Pittsburgh's Rose Bowl escutcheon," wrote Grantland Rice.  "Here was a Panther who belonged to the jungle and not to the zoo-- a fast, hard driving slashing Panther who put both fang and claw to work in beating Washington's Huskies 21 to 0 before 87,200 chilly witnesses."

Pittsburgh had been ranked No. 3 by the AP, behind No. 2 LSU, which met Santa Clara in the Sugar Bowl.  No. 1 ranked Minnesota, like other Big Ten Conference teams, was not allowed to play postseason.  LSU had lost the previous Sugar Bowl to TCU, by a 3–2 score. A crowd of 41,000 turned out in New Orleans to see the Tigers lose again.  The Santa Clara Broncos took a 14–0 lead in the first quarter and won 21–14.

A crowd of 17,000 turned out in Dallas to watch the first Cotton Bowl.  Sammy Baugh of TCU completed only 5 of 13 pass attempts, but had 110 yards and a touchdown as TCU beat Marquette, 16–6.

In the first annual Orange Bowl, 12,000 filled the stands in Miami to see the Duquesne Dukes beat the Mississippi State Maroons, 13–12.  Boyd Brumbaugh scored Duquesne's first touchdown and made the only extra point by either side.

Villanova tied Auburn, 7–7, in the Bacardi Bowl, played before 6,000 spectators in Havana, Cuba,  beat , 6–0, in Houston before 3,000, and Hardin–Simmons beat Texas Mines, 34–6, at the Sun Bowl in El Paso, Texas.

Heisman Trophy
1935 had been the first year that the Heisman Trophy was ever awarded, although it was named differently in the first year. It was known simply as the "DAC Trophy" for its inaugural year.  In 1936, John Heisman died and the trophy that is awarded to the best college football player in the US was renamed in his honor. Larry Kelley, the second winner of the award was the first man to win it officially named as the "Heisman Trophy."

Voting

The Slippery Rock National Championship

There was significant debate over who would be recognized as the national champion in 1936. Thus, a number of sportswriters across the country began to nominate several small colleges based on wins over the national champiopnship contenders via the transitive property. Essentially, the small college of choice would have beaten a team which had defeated another team which in turn defeated one or several of the legitimate national championship contenders. These were Minnesota (consensus), Pitt (BS, CFRA, HS), Duke (SR, WS), and LSU (BQPRS).

The most prominent claim for the national championship via transitive property was Slippery Rock College, which was given a claim because they had beaten Westminster College of Pennsylvania, which defeated West Virginia Wesleyan, which beat No. 14 Duquesne, which upset No. 3 Pitt, which beat former No. 1 Notre Dame, which upset former No. 1 Northwestern, which defeated AP national champion Minnesota.  The claim gave Slippery Rock wide notoriety throughout the country, and is why certain football teams, most notably Michigan and Texas, have occasionally broadcast the score of a Slippery Rock game during halftime.

Other claims to the 1936 national championship by this method were also made by Saint Vincent College of Latrobe, Pennsylvania, which followed the majority of Slippery Rock's line of successive wins, beating West Virginia Wesleyan 6 to 0 earlier in the 1936 season.  A case was made for Indiana State Teachers College as well, as they tied Lock Haven, who beat West Chester, which defeated Waynesburg, which connected to the Slippery Rock and St. Vincent's claims by defeating West Virginia Wesleyan 14 to 7.  A week before Thanksgiving, St. Thomas College of Pennsylvania was given national championship recognition after defeating Saint Vincent, 13 to 6.

See also
1936 College Football All-America Team

References